Jake Spanner, Private Eye is a 1989 American television crime film written and directed  by Lee H. Katzin and starring Robert Mitchum and Ernest Borgnine.

The supporting cast features Stella Stevens, Sheree North, John Mitchum, James Mitchum, Edie Adams, Terry Moore, Nita Talbot and Kareem Abdul-Jabbar.

Plot

Cast 

 Robert Mitchum as Jake Spanner 
 Ernest Borgnine as  Sal Piccolo 
 Stella Stevens as  Sandra Summers
 Dick Van Patten as  The Commodore
 Sheree North as  Mrs. Bernstein
  Laurie Lathem as  Toni New
 John Mitchum as  J.P. Spanner
 Richard Yniguez as  Ben Nunez
 James Mitchum as  Lieutenant Kevin Spanner 
 Edie Adams as  Senior Club Member
 Terry Moore as  Sally
 Clive Revill as  Herbert Soames
 Nita Talbot as  Nurse 
 Kenneth Kimmins as  Wellington Warren  
 Kareem Abdul-Jabbar as  Man at Sal's House
 Julius Carry as  Lenny   
 Edy Williams as  Sun Haven Lady

Reception   
Chicago Sun-Times' critic Daniel Ruth referred to the film as "far from a perfect movie", "marred by modest production" and with a fairly predictable  plot, but praised the performance of Mitchum, writing he  delivered " a marvelous performance", appearing "rejuvenated, sprightly and animated in a comfortable role".

References

External links 

1989 television films
1989 films
1980s crime films
American crime films
American detective films
American television films
Films directed by Lee H. Katzin
Films scored by Jimmie Haskell
1980s English-language films
1980s American films